Birds over the City is a 1974 Soviet drama film directed by Sergey Nikonenko.

Plot 
Andryusha and his fifth-grade classmates found poorly bound typewritten pages with the words 'Attack' in a pile of scrap materials. The guys enthusiastically read this collection of frontline stories. Their author Bukin, it turns out, lives nearby, in the next block. The man is not young and sickly; however, he does not succumb to the blows of fate. He devotes all his strength to the preservation of forest resources, and in his free time from these worries he continues to write stories, recalling certain episodes of a rich front-line life.

Cast 
 Mikhail Gluzsky as Aleksandr Vasilevich Bukin
  Andrey Gluzsky as young Bukin
 Igor Merkulov as Andryusha
 Sergey Nikonenko as Vishnyakov
 Raisa Kurkina as Margo
 Sergey Obrazov as Misha Solodukha
 Lidiya Fedoseyeva-Shukshina as Lida Vishnyakova
 Svetlana Orlova as Lena
 Olga Shukshina as Olya
 Mariya Shukshina as Masha
 Andrey Vishnev as Vasya
 Vera Altayskaya as teacher
 Georgy Burkov as bulldozer driver
 Vadim Zakharchenko as Pal Palych

References

External links 
 

1974 films
1970s Russian-language films
Soviet drama films
1974 drama films
Soviet war drama films
Soviet black-and-white films
Gorky Film Studio films
Films scored by Eduard Artemyev

Films set in Russia